Espejismo (English title: Illusion) is a Mexican telenovela produced by Fernando Chacón for Televisa in 1981. It starred by Fanny Cano, Carlos Piñar, Enrique Rocha, Charito Granados and Carmen Molina.

Cast 
Fanny Cano as Laura
Carlos Piñar as Raúl
Enrique Rocha as Julio
Charito Granados as Andrea
Carmen Molina as Martha
Felipe Gil as Rafael
Nerina Ferrer as Emma
Liliana Abud as Susana
Carlos Cámara as Roman
Manuel Saval as Juan José
Carmen del Valle as Lina
Tere Valadez as Elvira
Rosalba Brambila as Gaby
Fabian Lavalle
Nancy Mackienze
Rosario Granados
Alejandro Tomassi
Oscar Servin as ''Dr.Zubi

Enrique Barrera -Alberto
Carmelita Gonzalez-Esperanza
Rosalba Brambila.

References

External links 

Mexican telenovelas
1981 telenovelas
1981 Mexican television series debuts
1981 Mexican television series endings
Televisa telenovelas
Spanish-language telenovelas